The following units and commanders fought in the Battle of Iuka of the American Civil War. Order of battle compiled from the army organization, return of casualties and reports.

Abbreviations used

Military rank
 MG = Major General
 BG = Brigadier General
 Col = Colonel

Other
 k = killed
 w = wounded

Union

Army of the Mississippi

MG William S. Rosecrans

Confederate

Army of the West

MG Sterling Price

Notes

References
U.S. War Department, The War of the Rebellion: a Compilation of the Official Records of the Union and Confederate Armies, U.S. Government Printing Office, 1880–1901.
 Cozzens, Peter. The Darkest Days of the War: The Battles of Iuka and Corinth. Chapel Hill: The University of North Carolina Press, 1997. 

American Civil War orders of battle